This page is a list of Haitian education ministers.

The educational sector is under the responsibility of the Ministre de l'Éducation Nationale et de la Formation Professionnelle (MENFP). Minister of Public Instruction overseeing public education was first created in Haiti in 1843.

List of Ministers of Education of Haiti
Ministers (various titles) of Public Instruction of Haiti, 1844–2016.

References

Education